Steyskalina picta is a species of fly in the family Sciomyzidae which lives in the Orient.

References

Sciomyzidae
Insects described in 1999
Diptera of Asia